The Yangzhou International Horticultural Exposition 2021 is an A2/B1 class AIPH horticultural exhibition, held in Yangzhou, China from 8 April to 8 October 2021. The theme of the expo is "Green City, Healthy Life".

References

External links 
 Official Website

2021 in China
Horticultural exhibitions
Yangzhou
Yizheng